Tabor College is a private Mennonite college in Hillsboro, Kansas. It is owned and operated by the Mennonite Brethren Church and adheres to Anabaptist doctrine. There were 594 students enrolled at the Tabor College Hillsboro campus for the Fall 2014 semester. Total enrollment, including the Tabor College School of Adult and Graduate Studies in Wichita, was 766.

History
In 1908, Tabor College was founded by the Mennonite Brethren and Krimmer Mennonite Brethren Christian churches.

In 1961, Reimer Stadium was built on the south side of Tabor College campus and named after former athletic director Del Reimer.  In 2008, the old stadium was demolished then replaced by Joel Wiens Stadium in 2009, which was a joint venture between Tabor College and Hillsboro USD 410.  The new 3,000-seat stadium includes new artificial football and soccer turf, synthetic track and a throwing area for field events, new bleachers on the home side, a new press box, and new concession stand and restroom facilities.  The team locker rooms and athletic offices were also constructed at the north end of the stadium at college expense.

On March 1, 2019, it was announced that Tabor plans to relocate their online programs from Wichita to the Hillsboro campus.

Campus
Tabor's main campus is situated in Hillsboro, Kansas, located approximately 50 miles north of Wichita, Kansas.

Organization and administration
Tabor is owned and operated by the Mennonite Brethren Church.

Athletics

The Tabor athletic teams are called the Bluejays. The college is a member of the National Association of Intercollegiate Athletics (NAIA), primarily competing in the Kansas Collegiate Athletic Conference (KCAC) since the 1968–69 academic year.

Tabor competes in 20 intercollegiate varsity sports: Men's sports include baseball, basketball, cross country, football, golf, soccer, tennis and track & field (indoor and outdoor); while women's sports include basketball, cross country, golf, soccer, softball, tennis, track & field (indoor and outdoor) and volleyball; and co-ed sports include cheerleading.

Notable people
Faculty
 Mike Gottsch, former head football coach at Tabor College.
 Katie Funk Wiebe, writer
Alumni
 Donald Dahl, (1945–2014) – Kansas House of Representatives from 1997 to 2008, U.S. Navy.
Bob Glanzer (1945-2020) – South Dakota House of Representatives from 2017 to his death from COVID-19.
 Rolland Lawrence (b. 1951) – former professional football cornerback.
 Lane Lord (b. 1971), women's basketball coach at Pittsburg State University
 Theodore Schellenberg (1903–1970) – archivist and archival theorist.
 Martha Wall (1910-2000) - Christian medical missionary
 Jacob Webb (b. 1993) - Major League Baseball pitcher
 Roger Wollman (b. 1934) - United States federal appellate judge.

See also
 List of colleges and universities in the United States
 Joel Wiens Stadium

References

External links

 
 Tabor Athletics website

 
Buildings and structures in Marion County, Kansas
Education in Marion County, Kansas
Educational institutions established in 1908
Mennonitism in Kansas
Universities and colleges affiliated with the Mennonite Church
1908 establishments in Kansas
Council for Christian Colleges and Universities
Private universities and colleges in Kansas